William Glasgow may refer to:

William Glasgow (art director) (1906–1972), American art director
William Glasgow (general) (1876–1955), Australian general and politician